Pyrnus is a genus of spiders in the family Trachycosmidae. It was first described in 1880 by Simon. , it contains 9 species.

Species
Pyrnus comprises the following species:
Pyrnus aoupinie Platnick, 2002 - New Caledonia
Pyrnus baehri Platnick, 2002 - North Australia
Pyrnus fulvus (L. Koch, 1875) - South Australia 
Pyrnus insularis Platnick, 2002 - Lord Howe Island
Pyrnus magnet Platnick, 2002 -  Australia
Pyrnus numeus Platnick, 2002 - New Caledonia
Pyrnus obscurus (Berland, 1924) - New Caledonia
Pyrnus pins Platnick, 2002 - New Caledonia
Pyrnus planus (L. Koch, 1875) - Australia

References

Trochanteriidae
Araneomorphae genera
Spiders of Oceania